Arutyun Papazyan (born in Yerevan, May 25, 1954) is an Armenian pianist.

Papazyan rose to prominence after winning the 1979 Vianna da Motta competition and being awarded a 3rd prize in the X International Chopin Piano Competition. He has been internationally active as a concert pianist since.

References
Fryderyk Chopin Information Centre

1954 births
Living people
Musicians from Yerevan
Armenian classical pianists
Prize-winners of the International Chopin Piano Competition
20th-century Armenian musicians